"Cease to Exist" is a song by American deathcore band Suicide Silence. The track was released as the first single from their fourth studio album, You Can't Stop Me on May 6, 2014. It was the band's first single with singer Hernan "Eddie" Hermida.

Background
Eddie Hermida said "Cease to Exist" is "how much I hate pedophiles. I would go to great depths of pain to see people like that suffer the worst pain on earth imaginable!"

Release
The song became available for online streaming on May 5, 2014. The song was released as a digital single the next day with a lyric video being released as well. The song was performed live for the first time at Rock Am Ring 2014 on June 6, 2014.

Track listing

Personnel
Suicide Silence
 Hernan "Eddie" Hermida – vocals
 Mark Heylmun – lead guitar
 Daniel Kenny – bass
 Christopher Garza – rhythm guitar
 Alex Lopez – drums

References

2014 songs
Suicide Silence songs
Nuclear Blast Records singles
2014 singles
Songs about child abuse
Works about child sexual abuse
Songs about sexual assault